Qian Guoliang (January 1940 – 15 February 2023) was a Chinese general (shangjiang) of the People's Liberation Army (PLA), an alternate member of the 13th and 14th Central Committee of the Chinese Communist Party, and a member of the 15th and 16th Central Committee of the Chinese Communist Party.

Biography
Qian was born in Wujiang County (now Wujiang District of Suzhou), Jiangsu in 1940. He enlisted in the People's Liberation Army (PLA) in December 1958 and joined the Chinese Communist Party (CCP) in December 1960. He graduated from the PLA Military Academy and PLA National Defence University. In 1979, he participated in the Sino-Vietnamese War. In 1983, Qian rose to become chief of staff of the 27th Group Army and was then promoted again to the position of commander in July 1985. In December 1993, he became chief of staff of Jinan Military Region, rising to commander in November 1996. He became commander of Shenyang Military Region in December 1999, serving in the post until his retirement in December 2004.

Qian was promoted to the rank of major general (shaojiang) in September 1988, lieutenant general (zhongjiang) in July 1995 and general (shangjiang) in June 2002.

Qian died in Nanjing, Jiangsu on 15 February 2023, at the age of 83.

References

1940 births
2023 deaths
People from Suzhou
People's Liberation Army generals from Jiangsu
People's Republic of China politicians from Jiangsu
Chinese Communist Party politicians from Jiangsu
Commanders of the Jinan Military Region
Commanders of the Shenyang Military Region
Alternate members of the 13th Central Committee of the Chinese Communist Party
Alternate members of the 14th Central Committee of the Chinese Communist Party
Members of the 15th Central Committee of the Chinese Communist Party
Members of the 16th Central Committee of the Chinese Communist Party